The Simineh River, also known as the Tatavi Chay (Tatāhū Čāy), is a river in northern Iran, arising in the Zagros Mountains of Kurdistan Province north of Saqqez, that flows into the south end of Lake Urmia. Its waters are used primarily for agriculture and the return flow significantly degrades its water quality.

Like its twin the Zarineh River to the east, the Simineh arises in the Zagros Mountains of Kurdistan Province and flows north through West Azarbaijan Province. Unlike its twin, the Simineh has considerably less flow into Lake Urmia. Like the rest of the steams in the basin, the river has a seasonal variability in its flow rates, but during the spring run-off the river can discharge as much as  into Lake Urmia.

The Simineh River flows just to the west of the city of Bukan, and provides some of their water.

References

Rivers of West Azerbaijan Province
Assyrian geography
Landforms of West Azerbaijan Province
Iranian Kurdistan
Saqqez County